The Linares Cabinet constituted the 24th cabinet of the Bolivian Republic. It was formed on 9 December 1857, 91 days after José María Linares was installed as the 13th president of Bolivia following a coup d'état, succeeding the Córdova Cabinet. It was dissolved on 14 January 1861 upon Linares' overthrow in another coup d'état and was succeeded by a Government Junta.

Composition

History 
Upon his assumption to office, Linares charged all ministerial portfolios to Ruperto Fernández as secretary general pending the formation of a proper ministerial cabinet. A full council of ministers was appointed on 9 December 1857, three months later, composed of four ministers. In this cabinet, a new ministry, the Ministry of Development, was established.

Two future presidents, José María de Achá (1861–1864) and Tomás Frías (1872–1873; 1874–1876) were members of this cabinet.

Cabinets

Structural changes

References

Notes

Footnotes

Bibliography 

 

1857 establishments in Bolivia
1861 disestablishments in Bolivia
Cabinets of Bolivia
Cabinets established in 1857
Cabinets disestablished in 1861